The Sovereign Union of Nations (Derzhavny Soyuz Narodov; , Dzyarzhauny Sayuz Narodau) has been proposed as an anthem for the Union State. The song, which was modified from the State Anthem of the Soviet Union, refers to a wider union of the two nations (Belarus and Russia).

Lyrics

Russian

Transcript

Belarusian

English

May our unity be for good! 
Let the warmth of our friendly bonds grow stronger. 
Let it be ever brighter and more beautiful 
The free people's sovereign union! 

Be glorified by the peoples of the wisdom of the stored - 
The one that calls to the world! 
Hello, great, invincible 
Our community, all our people! 

We have the depths of centuries behind us - 
The history of our united country. 
And in peace days, and in the midst of hard times 
We swear that the Union is always right! 

Be glorified by the peoples of the wisdom of the stored - 
The one that calls to the world! 
Hello, great, invincible 
Our community, all our people!

References

External links 
 Sovereign Union of Nations 

European anthems
National anthems